Choorian  is a 1963 black and white Pakistani Punjabi language super-hit musical film.

It was the first Pakistani film to be given the "only for adults" rating by the censors. The film, when seen from today's standards, would seem quite "clean" to most audiences. But at the time, wearing body-baring dresses was taboo in Pakistan.

Actress Nasira, then famous Pakistani actress, wore dresses that exposed more than what was permissible at that time.

Cast
Laila
Akmal Khan
Nasira
Razia
Asif Jah
M. Ajmal
A. Shah Shikarpuri
Mazhar Shah
Rangeela
Fazal Haq
Saqi
Gulrez
Mehboob Kashmiri
Zarrin Panna

Film's music and super-hit film songs
This film had music by music director Tufail Farooqi, film song lyrics by Baba Alam Siahposh

References

1963 films
Punjabi-language Pakistani films
1960s Punjabi-language films
Pakistani black-and-white films